Tumse Na Ho Paayega is a 2019 Indian short-format web series produced by Eros Motion Pictures and Culture Machine. It is featured as a Eros Now Quickie and available for streaming at Eros Now. Juhi Bhatt debuted to acting through this series.

Plot
Bala is new computer science engineer and had come into an office of Mumbai. He faces many new unexpected troubles in the office following some romance and tragedy in his life.

Episodes
Episode 1: Har Jungle Ke Hote Hai Apne Jaanwar
Episode 2: Debut Pe Century 
Episode 3: Baby Steps 
Episode 4: Good One Zuckeberg
Episode 5: Are You Really That Stupid? 
Episode 6: What Does An Escort Do? 
Episode 7: Google Shikaar Pe Nikla Hai 
Episode 8: Small World 
Episode 9: Hum Sab Hi Na Prostitutes Hai
Episode 10: But I Love You

Cast
Aakash Deep Arora as Bala
Juhi Bhatt as Jugnu
 Rajiv Rajaram as Venkat
Anuradha Athlekar as Veronica
Sanket Shanware as Budoydev Bhaiya/Buddy
Maruf Ali as Mathur
Trisha Kale as Pari
Paromita Dey as Rachael

Reception
Shraddha Raut of Webfare said it as a "short but sweet" web series having a A funny tale of friendship, love, and office and a man's struggle of fitting to a new city with some amazing background music at apt times. The Digital Hash mentioned it as "Even with its flaws, Tumse Na Ho Payega is a good addition to the list of home-grown streaming content"

References

2019 web series debuts
Hindi-language web series